Swedish Baptists (or Scandinavian Baptists) are Baptists that trace their origins to Radical Pietism (that disassociated from Lutheranism or partially originated from an adjacent non-Lutheran tradition), the Mission Friends movement, and the Pietist or Pietistic Lutheran tradition of Lutheranism.

Denominations
Converge (Baptist denomination), formerly the Baptist General Conference (United States)
Baptist General Conference of Canada
Baptist Union of Sweden
Evangelical Free Church in Sweden (Baptist)
Finnish Baptist movement
Swedish Baptist Union of Finland 
Ethiopian Kale Heywet Church

Individual churches
Central Baptist Church (Sioux Falls, South Dakota)
Swedish Baptist Church (Davenport, Iowa)

References 

Baptist Christianity in Sweden
Radical Pietism